Stadio Ezio Scida is a football stadium in Crotone, Italy.  It is currently the home of F.C. Crotone. The stadium holds 16,547.

Ezio Scida
F.C. Crotone
Sports venues in Calabria
Buildings and structures in the Province of Crotone